Peter Pan: A Musical Adventure is a musical based on J. M. Barrie's 1904 play Peter Pan, or the Boy Who Wouldn't Grow Up, with a book by Willis Hall and music and lyrics by George Stiles and Anthony Drewe. The show opened in Copenhagen in 1996. The production was first broadcast in 2001 as a New Year's Eve concert, starring Sheila Hancock, Laura Michelle Kelly, and Joe McFadden. It was presented at Festival Hall in the 2002/2003 Christmas period.

Since then, Stiles and Drewe have revised the show. In the Christmas 2007 season the show played at the Birmingham Repertory Theatre, directed by Rachel Kavanaugh and starring Peter Caulfield, Gina Beck, and David Birrell, receiving positive reviews. A year later, it moved to the West Yorkshire Playhouse starring James Gillan, Amy Lennox, and David Birrell reprising his role as Captain Hook, again receiving positive reviews. A cast recording featuring the Leeds cast was released in 2009.

On Sunday 25 October 2015 a one-off concert version of the show was performed at the Adelphi Theatre in London's West End starring Bradley Walsh as Captain Hook, Sheila Hancock as the Storyteller, Ray Quinn as Peter Pan and Jenna Russell as Mrs Darling.

In 2018, the show was staged at the Chicago Shakespeare Theatre, directed by Amber Mak with revised book by Elliot Davis.

Musical numbers

References

1996 musicals
Works based on Peter Pan
British musicals